Taylor Frey (born April 28, 1989) is an American actor. He is best known for playing Don Hagerty in It Chapter Two (2019).

Education 
Taylor attended Viewmont High School graduating in 2004 and got his bachelor's from Brigham Young University. Due to BYU's honor code forbidding "homosexual contact," he was almost expelled during his time there. The school later cleared him for lack of evidence.

Career 
Frey has appeared in G.B.F., Gossip Girl, The Carrie Diaries, Gabriele Muccino's Summertime, It Chapter Two, and Days of Our Lives. He began his career as a Broadway actor. He performed in the plays: national tour of Hairspray How to Succeed in Business Without Really Trying, South Pacific, Finian's Rainbow, and The View UpStairs.

Filmography

Personal life 
Frey grew up Mormon. His hometown is in Las Vegas, Nevada. He is gay. Frey married American actor and singer Kyle Dean Massey in 2016 in Palm Springs, CA. The couple currently live in West Hollywood, CA. On April 22, 2021, He and Massey announced that they were expecting their first child via surrogacy. The couple welcomed their daughter, Rafa Massey-Frey, via surrogate on October 31, 2021.

References

External links 
 

1989 births
21st-century American male actors
American male film actors
American male musical theatre actors
American male soap opera actors
American male stage actors
American male television actors
Brigham Young University alumni
American gay actors
LGBT people from Nevada
Living people